Cameron Prairie National Wildlife Refuge is located approximately  southeast of Lake Charles, Louisiana, in north central Cameron Parish. It contains  that include fresh marsh, coastal prairie, and old rice fields.

The visitor center opened in 1994 and is located south of Lake Charles on Louisiana Highway 27, 11 miles south of Holmwood, Louisiana.  The center's exhibits focus on the birds and other wildlife found in the refuge, and the plant and animal life and different types of ecosystems. An animated exhibit features a Cajun resident named Tante Marie, who sits in a pirogue and talks about life in the refuge. The visitor center suffered damage from Hurricane Rita, and reopened with new exhibits in the fall of 2009.

Southwest Louisiana National Wildlife Refuge Complex 
In 2004, the Southwest Louisiana National Wildlife Refuge Complex was formed by administratively combining the Cameron Prairie National Wildlife Refuge,  Sabine National Wildlife Refuge, Shell Keys National Wildlife Refuge, and the Lacassine National Wildlife Refuge with headquarters at Cameron Prairie.

See also

 List of National Wildlife Refuges: Louisiana

References

External links
 Cameron Prairie National Wildlife Refuge - Southwest Louisiana National Wildlife Refuge Complex
 Cameron Creole Watershed Marsh Terracing Project
 Louisiana's Cameron-Creole Project: An Ecosystem-Based Watershed Project

National Wildlife Refuges in Louisiana
Museums in Cameron Parish, Louisiana
Natural history museums in Louisiana
Protected areas established in 1986
Protected areas of Cameron Parish, Louisiana
1986 establishments in Louisiana
Wetlands and bayous of Louisiana
Landforms of Cameron Parish, Louisiana